The 73rd District of the Iowa House of Representatives in the state of Iowa.

Current elected officials
Bobby Kaufmann is the representative currently representing the district.

Past representatives
The district has previously been represented by:
 Chuck Grassley, 1959-1971
 John E. Camp, 1971–1973
 Arthur A. Small, 1973–1979
 Jean Hall Lloyd-Jones, 1979–1983
 Ralph Rosenberg, 1983–1991
 William Bernau, 1991–1993
 Betty Grundberg, 1993–2003
 Jodi Tymeson, 2003–2011
 Julian Garrett, 2011–2013
 Bobby Kaufmann, 2013–present

References

073